The Centro Cultural de los Ejércitos (in English, Cultural Centre of the Armed Forces), is an educational military society currently based at Gran Vía 13 in Madrid. The building is also commonly known as Casino Militar.

History of the society 
Since the mid-nineteenth century, it had been considered the creation of a military scientific community directed to the promotion of study. The Centre of the Army and the Navy was founded in 1881 at the start of Calle de Fuencarral.

After changing headquarters on several occasions, the company bought a plot of land on the new Gran Vía, bordering Calle del Clavel and Calle del Caballero de Gracia. It was soon obvious the surface area to be insufficient, so a smaller adjoining one was added, making a total of 965 square meters.

When the Air Force was incorporated in 1940, the institution was renamed to Cultural Centre of the Armed Forces.

As of 2021, the Cultural Centre of the Armed Forces continues to carry out intense cultural and educational work.

The building 
The building is located at Gran Vía 13, in the Sol neighborhood of the Centro district of the Spanish capital. It also fronts Calle del Clavel 1 and Calle del Caballero de Gracia 9. 

The area on which the building was erected was acquired by the institution of the Casino Militar in 1912. It was inaugurated on 16 November 1916 by the king Alfonso XIII.

The ground floor is resolved by the use of depressed arches. The main floor fronts Gran Vía with an imposing balcony with semicircular arched doors and balustrades, while the side facing Calle del Clavel is finished off at both ends with stained glass windows made of glass and iron; the first floor has a balcony with a wrought iron guard rail and access is provided through a segmental arch with decorated tympana that disappear on the side to adapt to the greater height of the dining room; the second floor has lintelled windows that are linked with those of the upper floor by a perimeter fence topped by simple segmental arches that provides an undulating shape to the finishing cornice. The third floor on the side of Calle del Clavel enjoys a double height space to accommodate the library and it is crowned by semicircular arches with large shields on the keystones transforming the cornice into a crenellated meander.

The arched door at the entrance is protected by a large awning, a balustrade balcony on top of the main floor flanked by two double-height columns with Corinthian capitals that support a second balcony on the third floor, and a finishing tower surmounted by a slate-clad vaulted roof. This vertical ensemble acts as an axis of composition where symmetry is deliberately renounced, but where each element finds in response another similar but not identical component on the other side of the rounded corner.

The facade to Caballero de Gracia is simpler, although it respects the balance with its reciprocal at Clavel, with which it is articulated by means of a chamfer that culminates in a large coat of arms of Spain. 

It must also be mentioned the decorative importance given throughout the complex to the wrought iron lampposts scattered along the walls, balconies and terraces.

The construction obtained the first honorable mention at the City Council awards for the best-built properties in 1916, and his architect, Eduardo Sánchez Eznarriaga, received a cooperation diploma.

Gallery

Bibliography

References

Gran Vía (Madrid)